Brachyscelidae is a family of amphipods belonging to the order Amphipoda.

Genera:
 Brachyscelus Spence Bate, 1861

References

Amphipoda
Crustacean families